Tishreen Stadium is a multi-use all-seater stadium in Damascus, Syria, currently used mostly for football matches and serves as the home venue of the al-Shorta SC. The capacity of the stadium is 12,000 seats.

History
In 1976, the stadium was opened as part of the Tishreen Sports Complex, to host the 5th Pan Arab Games of 1976. The complex covers an area of 6.6 hectares. In addition to the football stadium, the complex is also home to an indoor sports hall, indoor swimming pool, 4 outdoor tennis courts, 2 outdoor basketball fields and an athletes' hotel. The headquarters of the Syrian Olympic Committee is also located in the complex.

On 20 February 2013, the Al-Wathba SC player Yussef Sleman was killed in Tishreen Stadium by a mortar shell, struck by the armed opposition, while preparing for a training session.

References

Football venues in Syria
Buildings and structures in Damascus